The Cavalry Corps of the Army of Northern Virginia was an organized unit of cavalry in the Confederate Army during the American Civil War. Starting out as a brigade in late 1861, becoming a division in 1862 and finally a Corps in 1863; it served in the Eastern Theater until the ANV's surrender in April 1865.

Formation and development under Maj. Gen. J.E.B. Stuart 

The rise of the ANV's Cavalry can be almost entirely tied to the career and organizational efforts of its first commander, Maj. Gen. J.E.B. Stuart. During summer 1861, before the Army of Northern Virginia was formed, the confederate cavalry in the Eastern Theater was limited to regiments or smaller units attached to districts or larger formations. Noteworthy were Stuart's 1st Virginia Cavalry, the 30th Virginia Cavalry and Hampton's Legion from South Carolina. Recommendations and endorsements from Generals P.G.T. Beauregard, Joseph E. Johnston and James Longstreet led to a promotion to brigadier general for Stuart in September 1861; and the formation of a unified cavalry brigade under his command. On August 17, 1862 the cavalry division was built – swollen to four brigades in less than a year. On September 9, 1863 the Cavalry Corps was finally established with six brigades in two divisions.

Key engagements of the Cavalry Division/Corps under Stuart's leadership included:

 The Raid around McClellan's army (Peninsula Campaign)
 The Raid on General Pope (First Battle of Rappahannock Station)
 Defense of Crampton's Gap (Maryland Campaign)
 The Raid around McClellan's army (following the Battle of Antietam)
 The Raid beyond the Rappahannock River
 The Battle of Fredericksburg: Check of Franklin's attack
 The Battle of Chancellorsville (Stuart temporarily commanded Second Corps)
 The Battle of Brandy Station
 The Raid around Meade's army (Gettysburg Campaign)
 The screen and defense of Lee following the Battle of Gettysburg
 The screen and defense of Lee against Sheridan in the 1864 Overland Campaign

Following the death of Stuart on May 11, 1864, the Cavalry Corps was split into two independent divisions under Hampton and Fitz Lee.

Command under Lt. Gen. Wade Hampton 

The second commander, wealthy South Carolina planter Wade Hampton III, had served as the senior brigade and division commander under J.E.B. Stuart. When the cavalry was split after Stuart's death Hampton continued to command his division for three months until General Robert E. Lee remerged the Cavalry Corps on August 11, 1864, under Hampton's command. He first managed the corps beginning with engagements screening the army along the Pamunkey River in engagements such as the Battle of Haw's Shop (historical Hawe's Shop). Originally Hampton was from Charleston, South Carolina, and continued to command cavalry units from the Carolinas in his division. Continuing in command through the Siege of Petersburg, General Lee decided to release his Carolina cavalry units, including Hampton, back to the aid and defense of South Carolina under the Army of Tennessee, as Maj. Gen. William T. Sherman began his march from Georgia to Columbia, South Carolina. Hampton and the Carolina cavalry units were moved by rail to Columbia, and fought delay-and-defense actions against Sherman. Key engagements under Hampton's leadership included:

 The Battle of Haw's Shop
 The Battle of Trevilian Station
 The Beefsteak Raid
 The Siege of Petersburg

Command under Maj. Gen. Fitzhugh Lee 

Upon the departure of General Hampton, Maj. Gen. Fitzhugh Lee took over the smaller remaining Cavalry Corps in February 1865. He was in command of the corps through the evacuation of Petersburg and Richmond, and through the course of the Appomattox Campaign, until the surrender of the Army of Northern Virginia. Key engagements under Lee's leadership included:

 Defense of Lee during the Appomattox Campaign
 The last cavalry charge on April 9, 1865, at Farmville, Virginia

Key personnel

Division commanders 
 Matthew C. Butler
 Wade Hampton III – succeeded Stuart in command of the cavalry
 Fitzhugh Lee – succeeded Hampton in command of the cavalry
 W.H.F. "Rooney" Lee
 Thomas T. Munford
 Thomas L. Rosser
 J.E.B. Stuart – original commander of the cavalry (brigade, division and corps)
 Pierce M. B. Young
 Rufus Barringer (temporary)
 Evander M. Law (temporary)
 Lunsford L. Lomax (temporary)

Brigade commanders 
 Turner Ashby
 Rufus Barringer
 John R. Chambliss
 Henry Brevard Davidson
 James Dearing
 John Dunovant
 Martin W. Gary
 James B. Gordon
 John D. Imboden
 William Lowther Jackson
 Albert G. Jenkins
 Bradley T. Johnson
 William E. "Grumble" Jones
 Evander M. Law
 Lunsford L. Lomax
 John McCausland
 William H. F. Payne
 William P. Roberts
 Beverly Robertson
 Williams C. Wickham
 Gilbert J. Wright
 George H. Smith (temporary)
 George H. Steuart (temporary)

Partisan & ranger commanders 
 Turner Ashby
 John D. Imboden
 William E. "Grumble" Jones
 Lunsford L. Lomax
 John S. Mosby
 Elijah V. White

Artillery & staff 
 Robert F. Beckham
 Heros von Borcke
 R. Preston Chew
 John Esten Cooke
 Henry B. McClellan
 John Pelham
 James Harrison Williams

See also
Cavalry Corps (Union Army)
Forrest's Cavalry Corps

References 
 Anderson, Paul Christopher, Blood Image: Turner Ashby in the Civil War and the Southern Mind, Louisiana State University Press, 2006, 
 Andrew, Rod Jr., Wade Hampton: Confederate Warrior to Southern Redeemer, North Carolina University Press, 2008, 
 Ashby, Thomas A., The Life of Turner Ashby, Morningside Bookshop, 1995, 
 Black, Robert W., Cavalry Raids of the Civil War, Stackpole Books, 2004, 
 Davis, Burke, JEB Stuart: The Last Cavalier, Gramercy; Reissue edition, 2000, 
 McDonald, William N., A History of the Laurel Brigade: Originally the Ashby Cavalry of the Army of Northern Virginia and Chew's Battery, The Johns Hopkins University Press, 2002, 
 Harbord, J. G. History of the Cavalry of the Army of Northern Virginia, 1904.

Notes 

Corps of the Confederate States Army
Army of Northern Virginia
J. E. B. Stuart
Military units and formations established in 1863
Military units and formations disestablished in 1865